Lleida is one of the four constituencies represented in the Parliament of Catalonia, the regional legislature of the autonomous community of Catalonia. The constituency currently elects 15 deputies. Its boundaries correspond to those of the Spanish province of Lleida. The electoral system uses the D'Hondt method and a closed-list proportional representation, with a minimum threshold of three percent.

Electoral system
The constituency was created as per the Statute of Autonomy of Catalonia of 1979 and was first contested in the 1980 regional election. The Statute requires for an electoral law to be passed by a two-thirds supermajority in the Parliament of Catalonia, but transitory provisions provide for the four provinces in Catalonia—Barcelona, Girona, Lleida and Tarragona—to be established as multi-member districts in the Parliament. Each constituency is allocated a fixed number of seats: 85 for Barcelona, 17 for Girona, 15 for Lleida and 18 for Tarragona.

Voting is on the basis of universal suffrage, which comprises all nationals over eighteen, registered in Catalonia and in full enjoyment of their political rights. Amendments to the electoral law in 2011 required for Catalans abroad to apply for voting before being permitted to vote, a system known as "begged" or expat vote. Seats are elected using the D'Hondt method and a closed list proportional representation, with an electoral threshold of three percent of valid votes—which includes blank ballots—being applied in each constituency. The use of the D'Hondt method may result in a higher effective threshold, depending on the district magnitude.

The electoral law allows for parties and federations registered in the interior ministry, coalitions and groupings of electors to present lists of candidates. Parties and federations intending to form a coalition ahead of an election are required to inform the relevant Electoral Commission within ten days of the election call—fifteen before 1985—whereas groupings of electors need to secure the signature of at least one percent of the electorate in the constituencies for which they seek election—one-thousandth of the electorate, with a compulsory minimum of 500 signatures, until 1985—disallowing electors from signing for more than one list of candidates.

Deputies

Elections

2021 regional election

2017 regional election

2015 regional election

2012 regional election

2010 regional election

2006 regional election

2003 regional election

1999 regional election

1995 regional election

1992 regional election

1988 regional election

1984 regional election

1980 regional election

References

Parliament of Catalonia constituencies
Province of Lleida
Constituencies established in 1980
1980 establishments in Spain